Brave New World is a 1998 television movie loosely based on Aldous Huxley's 1932 novel of the same name. The film stars Peter Gallagher and Leonard Nimoy. It is an abridged version of the original story. The film aired on NBC.

Plot
The movie loosely follows the plot of Huxley's novel, but adds a twist to the end.

Just as Bernard Marx is about to take over the job of Director of Hatcheries and Conditioning, replacing the disgraced previous director, Lenina informs him that she is pregnant with his child. She conceived it the night that John Savage fell to his death. She did not use her birth control that night. Bernard suggests that she say it was an accident and have an abortion, but she makes it clear that she will not, and so prefers banishment.

Bernard lets her go – secretly – and takes the job he has aspired to throughout his career, but he is soon unhappy, and no amount of Soma can change that. He has seen and learned to appreciate genuine emotions and human experiences thanks to knowing John, as has Lenina. As a result, Bernard follows Lenina into exile from society.

Director Mustapha Mond looks for Bernard at their scheduled meeting, and is handed a note. The messenger explains that Bernard got away from society by authorizing a trip for himself. Mond laughs out loud to himself, indicating that he will not pursue them. The final scene shows a beach with Lenina and Bernard. They appear to be playing with their natural born daughter on the shore.

Cast

Reception
The New York Times Caryn James said:"The film fails to deal coherently with what is frightening about modern life and why". Radio Times's David Parkinson said: "the over-simplification of the premise...will disappoint admirers of the novel". City University of New Yorks Brittany Franklin finds the 1998 movie excludes the praise of Ford. The Ringers Keith Phipps notes "Adapting it, on the other hand, proves far trickier. That’s partly because much of the novel is short on incident and long on ideas..." ScreenRant says: "Society Was Not Dominated By Religion" ScreenRant's Padraig Cotter says the 1998 TV movie has "a happy ending".

Further reading

See also
Brave New World (1980 film)
Brave New World (2020 TV series)
Gattaca
Idiocracy

References

External links

Brave New World (1998 film) text
Brave New World (1998 film) at archive.org

1990s dystopian films
1998 science fiction films
Films based on science fiction novels
Films based on works by Aldous Huxley
American science fiction television films
1998 television films
1998 films
Films based on British novels
American dystopian films
Films set in the 26th century
Films about totalitarianism
NBC network original films
Brave New World
Films scored by Daniel Licht
1990s English-language films
1990s American films